Miss Seychelles is the national Beauty pageant of the Seychelles responsible for selecting an ambassador of the country.

History
The Miss Seychelles Beauty Pageant was relaunched in 2012, after 4 year's absence from the Seychelles’ events calendar. In 2017, this was the last pageant funded by the government. In 2020, the Miss Seychelles returned under the new name "Miss Seychelles the National Pageant" and it will be organized by the newly formed organization, Beauty Empowerment Seychelles (BES), with Stephanie Duval as the chairperson and she will be assisted by Margaret Raguin and Kevin Perine.

Mission
The pageant's mission is to continue to
"propose a new era of involvement for the winner of the competition, opening the door of opportunity in the form of travelling abroad to represent Seychelles, not only in the Miss World pageant, but also at trade fairs and other international events as an ambassadress and spokesperson for our islands - their culture, spectacular natural beauty and national identity."

National franchise
The National Contest is conducted in agreement with Miss World Limited, the owners and organizers of the Miss World Contest, to elect "Miss World" and it is also an official preliminary contest to select a representative to participate in the Miss World Contest.

Titleholders

References

https://sbc.sc/news/miss-seychelles-pageant-to-be-held-dec-7-after-covid-postponement/

External links 
 Miss Seychelles Another World Site
 Stephanie Olivia Duval
 

Recurring events established in 1969
1969 establishments in Seychelles
Beauty pageants in Seychelles
Seychelles